Zeytun (also Romanized as Zeytūn) is a village in Gel Berenji Rural District, Khafr District, Jahrom County, Fars Province, Iran. At the 2006 census, its population was 212, in 57 families.

References 

Populated places in  Jahrom County